The 1998 UEFA Intertoto Cup finals were won by Valencia, Werder Bremen, and Bologna. All three teams advanced to the UEFA Cup. The 1998 tournament saw Spanish clubs debut in the competition and also the return of English clubs, since the controversy surrounding its participants in 1995.

Qualified teams

First round

First leg

Match awarded because Leiftur fielded an ineligible player.

Second leg

Baltika Kaliningrad won 5–1 on aggregate.

Örgryte won 5–2 on aggregate.

National București won 5–2 on aggregate.

Debrecen won 10–2 on aggregate.

Brno won 6–1 on aggregate.

Vojvodina won 5–3 on aggregate.

St. Gallen won 9–3 on aggregate.

OD Trenčín won 5–2 on aggregate.

Vorskla Poltava won 6–0 on aggregate.

Makedonija GjP won 5–3 on aggregate.

Torpedo Kutaisi won 7–1 on aggregate.

Ruch Chorzów won 3–2 on aggregate.

Rimavská Sobota won 3–2 on aggregate.

Kongsvinger won 9–1 on aggregate.

Lyngby won 4–2 on aggregate.

Diósgyőr won 5–2 on aggregate.

Hradec Králové won 2–1 on aggregate.

Altay won 5–4 on aggregate.

TPS 3–3 Sion on aggregate. TPS won on away goals rule.

Inkaras Kaunas 1–1 Baki Fahlasi on aggregate. Inkaras Kaunas won 5–4 on penalties.

Second round

First leg

Second leg

Werder Bremen won 5–1 on aggregate.

Sampdoria won 2–1 on aggregate.

Naţional București won 4–3 on aggregate.

Vojvodina won 4–0 on aggregate.

Bastia won 7–1 on aggregate.

Altay won 2–1 on aggregate.

Baltika Kaliningrad won 1–0 on aggregate.

Akademisk Boldklub 3–3 Vorskla Poltava on aggregate. Vorskla Poltava won on away goals rule.

Lommel 2–2 Torpedo Kutaisi on aggregate. Lommel won on away goals rule.

Samsunspor won 4–3 on aggregate.

Austria Salzburg won 3–2 on aggregate.

Brno 5–5 Espanyol on aggregate. Espanyol won on away goals rule.

Shinnik Yaroslavl won 5–2 on aggregate.

Örgryte 2–2 Ruch Chorzów on aggregate. Ruch Chorzów won on away goals rule.

Twente won 2–0 on aggregate.

Debrecen 1–1 Hradec Králové on aggregate. Debrecen won on away goals rule.

Third round

First leg

Second leg

Debrecen won 3–2 on aggregate.

Sampdoria won 4–0 on aggregate.

Espanyol won 2–1 on aggregate.

Ruch Chorzów 2–2 Estrela da Amadora on aggregate. Ruch Chorzów won 4–2 on penalties.

Bologna 3–3 Naţional București on aggregate. Bologna won on away goals rule.

Valencia won 4–2 on aggregate.

Samsunspor won 4–0 on aggregate.

Fortuna Sittard won 5–2 on aggregate.

Bastia won 4–3 on aggregate.

Werder Bremen won 5–2 on aggregate.

Austria Salzburg won 5–3 on aggregate.

Vojvodina won 4–2 on aggregate.

Semi–finals

First leg

Second leg

Vojvodina won 4–2 on aggregate.

Bologna won 3–2 on aggregate.

Austria Salzburg won 4–3 on aggregate.

Ruch Chorzów won 4–0 on aggregate.

Werder Bremen won 6–0 on aggregate.

Valencia won 3–0 on aggregate.

Finals

First leg

Second leg

Valencia won 4–1 on aggregate.

Werder Bremen won 2–1 on aggregate.

Bologna won 3–0 on aggregate.

See also
1998–99 UEFA Champions League
1998–99 UEFA Cup Winners' Cup

References

External links
Official site
Results at RSSSF

UEFA Intertoto Cup
4